Ethan Duncan Brooks (born 1 March 2001) is a South African professional soccer player who plays as a midfielder for AmaZulu and the South African national football team.

Club career
Born in Johannesburg, Brooks started his career with amateur side Panorama FC before being scouted by TS Galaxy in 2018, signing a contract with them a few days later. He made his debut for the club in a 2–2 National First Division draw with Cape Umoya United and two further appearances that season as TS Galaxy bought the South African Premier Division status of Highlands Park for the 2020–21 season. He made his Premier Division debut in December 2020 in a 2–0 defeat to Mamelodi Sundowns as he made 12 appearances in total across the 2020–21 season.

International career
After making his debut for South Africa against Uganda in June 2021, he was part of South Africa's squad at the 2021 COSAFA Cup.

References

External links

2001 births
Living people
South African soccer players
Soccer players from Johannesburg
Association football midfielders
TS Galaxy F.C. players
AmaZulu F.C. players
South African Premier Division players
National First Division players
South Africa international soccer players